(11 January 1910 – 20 November 1984) was a Norwegian newspaper editor and politician with the Norwegian Labour Party. He served as the 26th prime minister of Norway from 1971 to 1972 and again from 1973 to 1976. He was president of the Nordic Council in 1978.

Background
Bratteli was born on the island of Nøtterøy at Færder in Vestfold, Norway. His parents were Terje Hansen Bratteli (1879–1967) and Martha Barmen (1881–1937). He attended school locally, having many jobs including: work in fishing, as a coal miner and on a building site. Over a 9- to 10-month period, Bratteli travelled with whalers to Antarctica, where he worked in a guano factory at South Georgia Island. He was a student at the socialist school at Malmøya in 1933. Oscar Torp, chairman of the Norwegian Labour Party, asked him to become editor of Folkets Frihet  in Kirkenes and later editor of  Arbeiderungdommen which was published by the Socialist Youth League of Norway. For a period during 1940, he also served as Secretary of the Norwegian Labour Party.

Following the Nazi invasion of Norway, the daily newspaper Arbeiderbladet was closed down during 1940 by Nazi officials.   Bratteli subsequently participated in the Norwegian resistance movement. He was arrested by agents of Nazi Germany in 1942, and was a Nacht und Nebel prisoner of various German concentration camps; including Natzweiler-Struthof, from 1943 to 1945. He was also imprisoned in the Sachsenhausen concentration camp, north of Berlin. He was liberated from Vaihingen an der Enz concentration camp on 5 April 1945, by the Swedish Red Cross  White Buses along with fifteen other Norwegians who had survived.

Political career
After the liberation of Norway in 1945, Bratteli was appointed as Secretary of the Labour Party. He became chairman of the Workers' Youth League, vice chairman of the party, served on the newly formed defence commission, and in 1965; was made Chairman of the Labour Party. Bratteli was elected to the Norwegian Parliament from Oslo in 1950, and was re-elected on seven occasions.

He was appointed as Minister of Finance in Oscar Torp's cabinet, and from 1956 to 1960 in the third cabinet of Einar Gerhardsen. From 1960 to 1963, during Gerhardsen's third period as Prime Minister, he was Minister of Transport and Communications. He was also acting Minister of Finance from January–February 1962. In September 1963, when Gerhardsen's fourth cabinet was formed, Bratteli was again made Minister of Transport and Communications, a post he held until 1964.

The centre-right cabinet of Borten held office from 1965 to 1971, but when it collapsed, Bratteli became Prime Minister. In social policy, Bratteli's premiership saw the passage of a law in June 1972 that lowered the pension age to 67. Central to his political career was the question of Norway's membership of the European Community. Following the close rejection of membership in the 1972 referendum, his cabinet resigned. However, the successor cabinet Korvald only lasted one year, and the second cabinet Bratteli was formed following the 1973 Norwegian parliamentary election. Bratteli resigned as prime minister in January 1976 on the grounds of ill health. He was succeeded by fellow Labour member Odvar Nordli.

Personal life
Trygve Bratteli was married to Randi Helene Larssen (1924–2002). They had three children: two daughters, Tone and Marianne, and one son, professor Ola Bratteli (1946–2015).
Bratteli's memoirs  of his experiences in Nazi concentration camps was published in 1980. 
He died in 1984 and was buried at Vestre gravlund in Oslo.
Trygve Bratteli was a member of Friends of Israel within the Norwegian Labour Movement (Venner av Israel i Norsk Arbeiderbevegelse) which planted a forest to his memory in Israel.

References

See also
Einar Gerhardsen
Reiulf Steen

Other sources
Anderson, Gidske (1984) Trygve Bratteli (Oslo: Gyldendal)

Related reading
Bratteli Trygve  (1980) Fange I Natt Og Take  (Oslo: Tiden Norsk Forlag)

Notes
Thirteen  Norwegians  died at Vaihingen and were buried in a mass grave, according to:

External links

1910 births
1984 deaths
People from Vestfold
Norwegian newspaper editors
Members of the Storting
Ministers of Finance of Norway
Prime Ministers of Norway
Night and Fog program
Norwegian people of World War II
Politicians from Oslo
Norwegian autobiographers
Norwegian World War II memoirists
Vaihingen an der Enz concentration camp survivors
Natzweiler-Struthof concentration camp survivors
Ministers of Transport and Communications of Norway
Leaders of the Labour Party (Norway)
20th-century Norwegian politicians
20th-century Norwegian writers